Sarah Smith Herford or Mrs. John Herford (1818-c. 1870) was a British landscape painter and educator.

Sarah was the daughter of Edward Smith of Birmingham and married John Herford. and founded the Unitarian Boarding School for Girls in Altrincham, Cheshire. Among her children were sons Brooke, Edward, and William Henry Herford, and daughters Mary Chance and Laura Herford. Mary Chance became the mother of the painter Helen Allingham who Sarah Herford was said to have inspired.

Sarah Herford's work Landscape at Kenilworth was included in the book Women Painters of the World.

References

1818 births
Founders of English schools and colleges
Year of death missing
19th-century British women artists